John Bayley may refer to:

John Bayley (died 1611), MP for Salisbury
John Bayley (antiquary) (1787–1869), English antiquary
Sir John Bayley, 1st Baronet (1763–1841), Justice of the King's Bench
Sir John Bayley, 2nd Baronet (1793–1871), British baronet and cricketer 1817–1832
John Bayley (cricketer) (1794–1874), English cricketer 1822–1850
John Bayley (musician) (1847–1910), English bandmaster, clarinetist, violinist, and organist
John Bayley (writer) (1925–2015), British literary critic and writer
John Arthur Bayley (1831–1903), British Army officer

See also
John Bayly (disambiguation)
John Bailey (disambiguation)
John Baillie (disambiguation)
John Baily (disambiguation)